Steven Knight (16 March 1961 – 24 February 2009) was a former Australian rules footballer who played with Footscray in the Victorian Football League (VFL).		

Following his stint in the VFL, Knight transferred to South Australian National Football League (SANFL) club Port Adelaide where he played 42 games and kicked 67 goals from 1984 to 1986.

He died in February 2009 after a long illness.

Notes

External links 		
		
		
		
		
		
		
		
1961 births		
2009 deaths		
Australian rules footballers from Victoria (Australia)		
Western Bulldogs players
People educated at Geelong College
Port Adelaide Football Club (SANFL) players
Port Adelaide Football Club players (all competitions)